Daniel Gordon "Don" McIntyre (5 March 1915 – 16 July 2013) was an Australian rules footballer who played with Carlton in the VFL. McIntyre played as a defender, usually in the back pocket. He won a Best and Fairest in 1937 and was premiership player with Carlton in 1938.

A trained pilot, McIntyre flew operations in northern Australia and New Guinea during his service in the Royal Australian Air Force in World War II.

References

External links 

1915 births
2013 deaths
Australian rules footballers from Victoria (Australia)
Carlton Football Club players
Carlton Football Club Premiership players
John Nicholls Medal winners
One-time VFL/AFL Premiership players